West Ridge is one of 77 Chicago community areas. It is a middle-class neighborhood located on the far North Side of the City of Chicago. It is located in the 50th ward and the 40th ward. Also historically called North Town, and frequently referred to as West Rogers Park, it is bordered on the north by Howard Street, on the east by Ridge Boulevard, Western Avenue, and Ravenswood Avenue, the south by Bryn Mawr Avenue and Peterson Avenue, and on the west by Kedzie Avenue and the North Shore channel of the Chicago River. At one time joined with neighboring Rogers Park, it seceded to become its own village in 1890 over a conflict concerning park districts (known as the Cabbage War).  West Ridge was annexed to Chicago on April 4, 1893, along with Rogers Park.

Today West Ridge is one of Chicago's better off communities, filled with multi-ethnic culture lining Devon Avenue, historic mansions lining Ridge and Lunt Avenues, cultural institutions such as St. Scholastica Academy and one of the highest per capita incomes on the North Side of Chicago.

It is home to the Midwest's largest Hasidic community, as well as other Jewish, Irish American, German-American, Indian, Pakistani, Bangladeshi, Assyrian, Russian,  Korean and Rohingya immigrant communities.

Neighborhoods and sub-areas

Golden Ghetto 
The Golden Ghetto is bounded on the north by Warren Park and Pratt Avenue and on the south by Peterson Avenue. It acquired its name from the thriving Jewish community there from about 1930 to the mid-1970s. The Jewish community peaked at over 47,000 in the 1960s. That community began to drift into the suburbs in the 1960s, and the neighborhood began to be home to South Asians and Russian Jews from about that time.

The heyday of the area is the topic of Adam Langer's Crossing California, told from the perspective of the second-generation residents during their middle school and teenage years. There has been a recent resurgence in Jewish residents, up from a nadir of 20,000 to around 25,000 in the late 2010s, due to increased Orthodox residents.

Rogers Park Manor Bungalow Historic District
The Rogers Park Manor Bungalow Historic District is a residential historic district in the West Ridge neighborhood of Chicago, Illinois. The district includes 329 buildings, 247 of which are Chicago bungalows built in the 1920s. The district was added to the National Register of Historic Places on November 15, 2005.

Talman West Ridge Bungalow Historic District
The Talman West Ridge Bungalow Historic District is a residential historic district in the West Ridge neighborhood of Chicago, Illinois. 181 of the district's 272 buildings are either brick Chicago bungalows or older stucco bungalows built from 1919 to 1930.

Schools

Public schools

Chicago Public Schools operates public schools.
 Clinton Elementary School
 Jamieson Elementary School
 Daniel Boone Elementary School
 Stephen Decatur Classical School
 George Armstrong Elementary School
 Philip Rogers Elementary School
Stone Scholastic Academy
 West Ridge Elementary School
Stephen Tyng Mather High School

Private schools

 ABC Academy
 Bais Yaakov High School
 Bethesda Evangelical Lutheran School
 Bnos Rabbeinu High School
 Cheder Lubavitch Girls Elementary / High School
 Hanna Sacks Bais Yaakov High School
 Joan Dachs Bais Yaakov / Tiferes Tzvi Elementary School
 Keshet High School
 Lubavitch Mesivta of Chicago
 Native American Educational Services College
 Victor C. Neumann School
 Sofer Nathan's Vocational College
 St. Hilary Elementary School
 St. Margaret Mary School
 St. Philips Evangelical Lutheran School
 Tzemach Tzedek Elementary School (Opened 2002)
 Yeshivas Brisk / Brisk Rabbinical College
 Yeshiva Migdal Torah School
 Yeshiva Ohr Boruch-Veitzener Cheder

Politics
West Ridge has supported the Democratic Party in the past three presidential elections,  In the 2016 presidential election, West Ridge cast 16,712 votes for Hillary Clinton and cast 4,772 votes for Donald Trump. In the 2012 presidential election, West Ridge cast 14,446 votes for Barack Obama and cast 5,345 votes for Mitt Romney.

It had been represented in the Chicago City Council by Alderman Bernard Stone from 1973 until May 2011. On April 5, 2011, Alderman Debra Silverstein defeated Stone in a runoff election and now represents the 50th Ward, which encompasses West Ridge.

Religion
The Roman Catholic Archdiocese of Chicago operates Catholic churches. On July 1, 2020, St. Henry, St. Margaret Mary, and St. Timothy churches will merge.

Historical population

Source:

Bus routes 
CTA:
11 Lincoln
49B North Western
82 Kimball-Homan
84 Peterson
93 California/Dodge (Monday–Saturday only)
96 Lunt (Weekdays only)
97 Skokie
155 Devon
206 Evanston Circulator (Weekday rush hours only)

Pace:
215 Crawford-Howard
290 Touhy

Notable people
 Sidney Blumenthal (born 1948), journalist, political operative, and Senior Advisor to President Bill Clinton. He resided at West Birchwood Avenue in West Rogers Park as a child.
 Howard W. Carroll (1942–2021), member of the Illinois Senate from 1973 to 1999. He resided at 6014 North Francisco Avenue during his political career.
 Philip H. Corboy (1924–2012), trial lawyer. He was a childhood resident of West Rogers Park, living at 2836 West Lunt Street.
 Leo Lerner (1907–1965), newspaper publisher. According to the 1940 United States Census, he resided at 2120 West Lunt Avenue.
 Louis A. Lerner (1935–1984), United States Ambassador to Norway during the Carter administration. According to the 1940 United States Census, he resided at 2120 West Lunt Avenue.
 John H. Leims (1921–1985), Captain in the United States Marine Corps and recipient of the Medal of Honor. He resided in West Ridge at 5837 North Talman Avenue.

References

External links

 Official City of Chicago West Ridge Community Map
 Chicago Park District: Indian Boundary Park
 Lakeside Community Development Corporation
 Photographs of Devon Avenue by Jordan Bettis
 Rogers Park West Ridge Historical Society

Community areas of Chicago
Former municipalities in Illinois
Former populated places in Illinois
North Side, Chicago
Jews and Judaism in Chicago